Nahuel Darío Fioretto (born 25 January 1981) is an Argentine footballer who played as a midfielder.

References

External links
 
 
 

1981 births
Living people
Argentine footballers
Argentine expatriate footballers
Association football midfielders
People from San Martín, Buenos Aires
Sportspeople from Buenos Aires Province
Boca Juniors footballers
Boca Unidos footballers
Ferro Carril Oeste footballers
Club Atlético Huracán footballers
Club Atlético Lanús footballers
Olimpo footballers
Instituto footballers
Unión de Santa Fe footballers
Independiente Rivadavia footballers
Club Bolívar players
Cobreloa footballers
Deportivo Táchira F.C. players
SpVgg Unterhaching players
Defensores de Belgrano footballers
Deportivo Riestra players
Talleres de Remedios de Escalada footballers
Deportivo Laferrere footballers
3. Liga players
Primera B de Chile players
Argentine expatriate sportspeople in Chile
Argentine expatriate sportspeople in Bolivia
Argentine expatriate sportspeople in Germany
Argentine expatriate sportspeople in Venezuela
Expatriate footballers in Chile
Expatriate footballers in Bolivia
Expatriate footballers in Germany
Expatriate footballers in Venezuela